is Maaya Sakamoto's second singles collection. The limited edition version of the album was available with a DVD containing music videos. The album debuted at #3 on the Oricon weekly charts and sold 69,966 copies, this is Maaya Sakamoto's best selling album so far.

Track listing

Charts

References

Maaya Sakamoto albums
Albums produced by Yoko Kanno
2003 compilation albums
Victor Entertainment compilation albums